Jolina Marie Bautista Reyes (born September 8, 1996), better known by her stage name Krystal Reyes, is a Filipino actress.

Career
She became famous for her role as the young Kristal in the teledrama Bakekang, a role where she would eventually gain her current screen name. After the show ended, she landed her first starring role as Princess, one of the two title characters in Princess Charming, another Philippine drama. Her biggest break came when she landed the role of Anghelita in Mga Mata ni Anghelita, a remake of the 1978 Philippine movie of the same title (without the letter H on it) which made famous the late Julie Vega. Fellow child actress Ella Guevara was originally considered for the role, but since Guevara was by then already part of the main cast of another teledrama entitled Impostora, Reyes was able to land the role. Other than her appearances on television, she has also appeared in the film Shake, Rattle & Roll 8.

Reyes won Best Children's Show Host together with Pia Arcangel and Tonipet Gaba for Art Angel in the 2007 PMPC Star Awards for Television, as well as Best Children's Show. Art Angel again won Best Children's Show in the 2008 and 2009 PMPC Star Awards for Television.

In 2012, she appeared in Hiram na Puso as Angeline and her comeback drama show Hindi Ka Na Mag-iisa.

Reyes was part of the 2013 remake of the 1996 hit TV series Anna Karenina with Barbie Forteza and Joyce Ching.

After Healing Hearts, she became semi-active in showbiz to focus on her studies. She's currently a freelancer, though she occasionally appears on GMA.

Personal life
Reyes was born in Barangay Bulac, Santa Maria, Bulacan. Krystal is the niece of GMA resident director Mark Reyes.

Filmography

Television

Movies

Awards and nominations

References

External links
 

1996 births
Living people
Actresses from Bulacan
Filipino child actresses
Filipino television actresses
People from Santa Maria, Bulacan
GMA Network personalities